John G. Hartnett (born 24 March 1952 in Manjimup, Western Australia), is an Australian young Earth creationist and cosmologist. He has been active with Creation Ministries International and is known for his opposition to the Big Bang theory and criticism of the dark matter and dark energy hypotheses.

He received both his BSc (Hons) (1973) and PhD with distinction (2001) from the School of Physics at the University of Western Australia (UWA). He currently works as a Research Fellow at the University of Adelaide, South Australia. He has published more than 200 papers in scientific journals, book chapters and conference proceedings, holds one patent, works on the development of ultra-stable cryocooled sapphire oscillators and participated on a Sapphire Clock Ensemble project (Atomic Clock Ensemble in Space Mission) run by the European Space Agency. He also has written articles for several creationist journals and, according to Creation Ministries International, Hartnett "believes that God is the real creator of the universe as the Bible says."

Research interests
His research interests include ultra low-noise radar and ultra high stability cryogenic microwave oscillators and clocks based on a pure single-crystal sapphire resonators. Applications for the latter are to provide low noise local oscillators to atomic physics labs, time and frequency atomic fountain standards, and very high frequency VLBI (Very-Long-Baseline-Interferometry) radio-astronomy. The terrestrial clock technology co-developed by him is claimed to be the most stable in the universe, with Hartnett et al. stating that it outperformed the stability of signals generated by pulsars (rotating neutron stars that produce highly periodic bursts of radio waves; such astronomical sources are then used as natural clocks e.g. for tests of physics). Further on, he is interested in the development of cryocooled CSO resonators, detection of WISPs using low noise microwave techniques, tests of the fundamental theories of physics, such as special and general relativity, measurement of drift in fundamental constants and their cosmological implications and cosmology and the large scale structure of the universe. He is also part of a team of scientists who are building liquid helium-cooled oscillators used by sapphire clocks for the National Metrology Institute of Japan in Tsukuba, Japan.

According to Moshe Carmeli, Professor of Theoretical Physics at Ben Gurion University in Beer Sheva, Israel, Hartnett asserted in his theory that there is no need to assume the existence of dark matter in the universe.

Publications
John Hartnett is the author of the book "Starlight, Time and the New Physics" (2007). and co-author of the book "Dismantling the Big Bang".

Patents
P1 "Temperature Compensated Oscillator"; US Patent Number 7,046,099, issued 16 May 2006. Obtained from US patent search.

See also
Russell Humphreys, an American physicist and creationist author.

References

Bibliography

 (46 search results for "Hartnett")
 "David Kaiser is a professor...at the Massachusetts Institute of Technology... His physics research focuses on early-universe cosmology..."

1952 births
Living people
Australian Christians
Australian physicists
Christian writers
Christian Young Earth creationists
Cosmologists
People from Manjimup, Western Australia
Academic staff of the University of Adelaide
University of Western Australia alumni